Józefów (derived from Józef, Polish version of the name Joseph) is a very common placename in Poland.

Towns
 Józefów in Masovian Voivodeship, near Warsaw
Józefów, Biłgoraj County in Lublin Voivodeship (east Poland)

Villages
Józefów, Chełm County in Lublin Voivodeship (east Poland)
Józefów, Gmina Gorzków in Lublin Voivodeship (east Poland)
Józefów, Lublin County in Lublin Voivodeship (east Poland)
Józefów, Gmina Bełchatów in Łódź Voivodeship (central Poland)
Józefów, Gmina Drużbice in Łódź Voivodeship (central Poland)
Józefów, Brzeziny County in Łódź Voivodeship (central Poland)
Józefów, Kutno County in Łódź Voivodeship (central Poland)
Józefów, Łask County in Łódź Voivodeship (central Poland)
Józefów, Łęczyca County in Łódź Voivodeship (central Poland)
Józefów, Opoczno County in Łódź Voivodeship (central Poland)
Józefów, Gmina Poddębice in Łódź Voivodeship (central Poland)
Józefów, Gmina Zadzim in Łódź Voivodeship (central Poland)
Józefów, Gmina Kodrąb in Łódź Voivodeship (central Poland)
Józefów, Gmina Ładzice in Łódź Voivodeship (central Poland)
Józefów, Gmina Przedbórz in Łódź Voivodeship (central Poland)
Józefów, Rawa County in Łódź Voivodeship (central Poland)
Józefów, Sieradz County in Łódź Voivodeship (central Poland)
Józefów, Skierniewice County in Łódź Voivodeship (central Poland)
Józefów, Tomaszów Mazowiecki County in Łódź Voivodeship (central Poland)
Józefów, Wieluń County in Łódź Voivodeship (central Poland)
Józefów, Wieruszów County in Łódź Voivodeship (central Poland)
Józefów, Zgierz County in Łódź Voivodeship (central Poland)
Józefów, Łuków County in Lublin Voivodeship (east Poland)
Józefów, Gmina Mełgiew in Lublin Voivodeship (east Poland)
Józefów, Gmina Piaski in Lublin Voivodeship (east Poland)
Józefów, Włodawa County in Lublin Voivodeship (east Poland)
Józefów, Mielec County in Subcarpathian Voivodeship (south-east Poland)
Józefów, Stalowa Wola County in Subcarpathian Voivodeship (south-east Poland)
Józefów, Gmina Górzno in Masovian Voivodeship (east-central Poland)
Józefów, Gmina Żelechów in Masovian Voivodeship (east-central Poland)
Józefów, Gmina Goszczyn in Masovian Voivodeship (east-central Poland)
Józefów, Gmina Nowe Miasto nad Pilicą in Masovian Voivodeship (east-central Poland)
Józefów, Gmina Pniewy in Masovian Voivodeship (east-central Poland)
Józefów, Legionowo County in Masovian Voivodeship (east-central Poland)
Józefów, Lipsko County in Masovian Voivodeship (east-central Poland)
Józefów, Mińsk County in Masovian Voivodeship (east-central Poland)
Józefów, Radom County in Masovian Voivodeship (east-central Poland)
Józefów, Gmina Kampinos in Masovian Voivodeship (east-central Poland)
Józefów, Gmina Dąbrówka in Masovian Voivodeship (east-central Poland)
Józefów, Gmina Strachówka in Masovian Voivodeship (east-central Poland)
Józefów, Gmina Zwoleń in Masovian Voivodeship (east-central Poland)
Józefów, Gmina Tczów in Masovian Voivodeship (east-central Poland)
Józefów, Żyrardów County in Masovian Voivodeship (east-central Poland)
Józefów, Gmina Godziesze Wielkie in Greater Poland Voivodeship (west-central Poland)
Józefów, Gmina Lisków in Greater Poland Voivodeship (west-central Poland)
Józefów, Gmina Opatówek in Greater Poland Voivodeship (west-central Poland)
Józefów, Krotoszyn County in Greater Poland Voivodeship (west-central Poland)
Józefów, Ostrów Wielkopolski County in Greater Poland Voivodeship (west-central Poland)
Józefów, Pleszew County in Greater Poland Voivodeship (west-central Poland)
Józefów, Gmina Dobra in Greater Poland Voivodeship (west-central Poland)
Józefów, Gmina Władysławów in Greater Poland Voivodeship (west-central Poland)
Józefów, Lubusz Voivodeship (west Poland)
Józefów, Opole Voivodeship (south-west Poland)

See also
Józefów nad Wisłą
Gmina Józefów